The Aarhus Theologians was a well-known group of four Danish theologians, all professors at the University of Aarhus, who, in the second half of the twentieth century, had a huge influence on Danish philosophy and theology.  The group consisted of P. G. Lindhardt, K. E. Løgstrup, Regin Prenter and Johannes Sløk.

Academic staff of Aarhus University
Danish Protestant theologians